Nguyễn Văn Toàn (born 12 April 1996) is a Vietnamese professional footballer who plays as a forward for K League 2 club Seoul E-Land and the Vietnam national team.

Club career

Seoul E-Land FC
On 4th January 2023, Văn Toàn joined South Korean K League 2 club Seoul E-Land.

International career
Văn Toàn made his international debut against Chinese Taipei on 24 March 2016. That same match he scored two goals in a 4–1 win.

Career statistics

International

International goals
Vietnam U19

Vietnam U23

Vietnam Olympic

Vietnam

Honours
Vietnam 
AFF Championship: 2018
VFF Cup: 2022

Vietnam U-23 
VFF Cup: 2018

Individual
AFF U-19 Youth Championship top goalscorer: 2013
V.League 1 top assist provider: 2019, 2020

References 

1996 births
Living people
Vietnamese footballers
Association football forwards
Hoang Anh Gia Lai FC players
Seoul E-Land FC players
V.League 1 players
K League 2 players
People from Hải Dương province
Vietnam international footballers
Southeast Asian Games bronze medalists for Vietnam
Southeast Asian Games medalists in football
Footballers at the 2018 Asian Games
2019 AFC Asian Cup players
Competitors at the 2015 Southeast Asian Games
Competitors at the 2017 Southeast Asian Games
Asian Games competitors for Vietnam
Vietnamese expatriate footballers
Vietnamese expatriate sportspeople in South Korea
Expatriate footballers in South Korea